The 1795 Sydney tornado was the first tornado ever recorded in Australia. The tornado caused damage to crops and land in the early settlement. Little is known about the event due to a lack of supplies or significant technology to record data during early colonization.

References 

History of Sydney
Tornadoes in Australia
Tornadoes of 1795